The Future Force unit of action (UA) was designed by the United States Army’s tactical war-fighting echelon. Although optimized for offensive operations, the Future Combat Systems (FCS) equipped unit of action (UA) will have the ability to execute a full spectrum of operations. FCS will improve the strategic deployability and operational maneuver capability of ground combat formations without sacrificing lethality or survivability.

Each will consist of:
 3 combined arms battalions (CABs)
 1 non-line-of-sight (NLOS) cannon battalion
 1 reconnaissance surveillance and target acquisition (RSTA) squadron
 1 forward support battalion (FSB)
 1 brigade intelligence and communications company (BICC)
 1 headquarters company

See also
British Army's Future Army Structure (Next Steps), for comparison.

References
FCS White Paper, April 2008

Brigades of the United States Army